So Dark You See is the eleventh studio album by folk singer-songwriter John Gorka, released on October 13, 2009.  The album offers eight new examples of Gorka's own lyrical songwriting, two instrumental tracks, poetry of Robert Burns and William Stafford performed and set to music by Gorka, covers of songs by fellow folk musicians, Utah Phillips and Michael Smith, and Gorka's take on the blues standard, "Trouble in Mind".

History
This was Gorka's eleventh studio album release in a career that has spanned over two decades. The album held the top position on the Folk Radio airplay chart for the months of September and October 2009. Folk Alley named "Ignorance & Privilege" as No. 6 on their list of The Top 10 Folk Songs of 2009.

Reception and commentary
Critical response was positive.

Track listing

Personnel
Musicians
 John Gorka — vocals, fretless banjo, guitar, harmonium, keyboards and percussion
 Marc Anderson — percussion
 Dan Chouinard – accordion
 Dick Freymuth – electric guitar
 Rob Genadek – Percussion
 Eliza Gilkyson — vocals
 Dean Magraw — electric and acoustic guitars
 Michael Manring — fretless bass
 Peter Ostroushko — fiddle and mandolin
 Joel Sayles – vocals, upright bass
 Enrique Toussaint – electric bass
 Jeff Victor – keyboards

Production
 Produced by Rob Genadek and John Gorka
 Engineering by Rob Genadek and John Gorka at The Brewhouse in Minneapolis, MN
 Lucy Kaplansky recorded by Mark Dann in New York City

Artwork
 Front cover painting, "Clairmont near Ascutney" by Tom Pirozzoli
 Back cover photography by Jos Van Vliet
 Art direction and design by Jon Reischl

Chart performance

References

External links
So Dark You See page at Red House Records
So Dark You See at John Gorka Video Site  (fan page)

2009 albums
John Gorka albums
Red House Records albums